William Proctor may refer to:

 Will Proctor, American football player
 William Proctor (Salem), one of the accused in the Salem witch trials
 William Proctor (Australian politician) (1850–1905), New South Wales politician
 William Proctor (UK politician) (1896–1967), Labour Party Member of Parliament (MP) for Eccles 1945–1964
 William Beauchamp-Proctor (1781–1861), British Royal Navy officer
 William H. Proctor (1827-1902), member of the Wisconsin State Assembly
 William L. Proctor (born 1933), Republican Party member of the Florida House of Representatives

See also
 William Procter (disambiguation)